{{Infobox NFL biography
| name         = Del'Shawn Phillips
| image        = 
| image_size   = 
| alt          = 
| caption      = 
| current_team = Free Agent
| number       = 53
| position     = Linebacker
| birth_date   = 
| birth_place  = Highland Park, Michigan, U.S.
| height_ft    = 6
| height_in    = 2
| weight_lbs   = 230
| high_school  = Cass Technical(Detroit, Michigan)
| college      = Illinois
| undraftedyear= 2019
| pastteams    = 
 Atlanta Falcons*
 Buffalo Bills (–)
 New York Jets
 Baltimore Ravens (
Del'Shawn Phillips (born October 9, 1996) is an American football linebacker for the Baltimore Ravens of the National Football League (NFL). He played college football at Illinois.

College career
Phillips had committed to play college football at Western Michigan, but was ruled academically ineligible. He spent a year away from football and took online courses at Mott Community College before enrolling at Garden City Community College in Garden City, Kansas. As a freshman, he recorded 72 tackles, 12.5 tackles for loss and 7.0 sacks. Phillips finished his sophomore season with 95 tackles as the Broncbusters won the 2016 NJCAA National Football Championship. He initially committed to transfer to Arizona for the final two seasons of his eligibility, but changed his commitment to Illinois.

Phillips was named a starter at linebacker going into his first season at Illinois and finished the season as the Fighting Illini's leading tackler with 85. He was voted a team captain as a senior and again led the team with 95 tackles and also interceptions with four and was named honorable mention All-Big Ten Conference.

Professional career

Atlanta Falcons
Phillips was signed by the Atlanta Falcons as an undrafted free agent on April 29, 2019. He was waived during final roster cuts on August 31, 2019.

Buffalo Bills
Phillips was signed by the Buffalo Bills to their practice squad on October 30, 2019. He spent the remainder of the season on the practice squad and signed a futures contract with the team on January 6, 2020. Phillips made his NFL debut in the Bills' season opener against the New York Jets on September 13, 2020. He was placed on injured reserve on October 12, 2020, after suffering a quad injury in Week 1. He was activated on November 7, 2020. He was placed back on injured reserve on November 13. On January 19, 2021, Phillips was waived by the Bills. He played in only two NFL games, all 14 of his snaps coming on special teams.

New York Jets
On March 23, 2021, Phillips signed with the New York Jets. He was waived on August 31, 2021, and re-signed to the practice squad the next day. He was promoted to the active roster on September 21. Phillips was waived by the New York Jets on August 30, 2022.

Baltimore Ravens 
On August 31, 2022, Phillips was claimed off waivers by the Baltimore Ravens.

References

External links
Baltimore Ravens bio
Illinois Fighting Illini bio

1996 births
Living people
21st-century African-American sportspeople
African-American players of American football
Garden City Broncbusters football players
Cass Technical High School alumni
Players of American football from Detroit
American football linebackers
Illinois Fighting Illini football players
Buffalo Bills players
New York Jets players
Baltimore Ravens players